Dana Soumbouloglou  is a natural bodybuilder, figure competitor athlete, and certified personal trainer. She is considered Jordan's first active female bodybuilder to compete internationally. She competed in the Stephanie Worsfold Natural Classic in Canada in 2018 and placed second, and in the Olympia Amateur in Las Vegas in 2019 and got 1st callout.

References

External links
"Jordanian iron woman aims to muscle her way past prejudice" from Middle East Eye
"Building more than muscle" from The Echo

Jordanian sportswomen
Female bodybuilders
1994 births
Living people